The Committee for the Preservation of the White House is an advisory committee charged with the preservation of the White House, the official home and principal workplace of the president of the United States. The committee is largely made up of citizens appointed by the president for their experience with historic preservation, architecture, decorative arts, and for their scholarship in these areas.

The Committee for the Preservation of the White House was created by executive order in 1964 by President Lyndon Johnson to replace a temporary White House Furnishings Committee established by First Lady Jacqueline Kennedy during the Kennedy White House restoration (1961–1963). The committee is charged with establishing policies relating to the museum function of the White House, its state rooms and collections. It also works with the White House Historical Association in making recommendations on acquisitions for the permanent collection of the White House and provides advice on changes to principal rooms on the ground floor, state floor, and the historic guest suites on the residence floor of the White House Executive Residence.

The executive order states that the curator of the White House, Chief Usher of the White House, Secretary of the Smithsonian Institution, the chair of the United States Commission of Fine Arts, and director of the National Gallery of Art serve as ex officio members of the committee. The director of the National Park Service serves as chair of the committee, and the First Lady serves as the honorary chair of the committee.

In February 2010, Los Angeles interior designer Michael S. Smith was appointed to the committee; in August of that year, his makeover of the Oval Office was revealed to the public.

See also
 :Category:Rooms in the White House
 White House Office of the Curator
 Art in the White House

Notes

References
 Abbott James A., and Elaine M. Rice. Designing Camelot: The Kennedy White House Restoration. Van Nostrand Reinhold: 1998. .
 Garrett, Wendell. Our Changing White House. Northeastern University Press: 1995. .
 Monkman, Betty C. The White House: The Historic Furnishing & First Families. Abbeville Press: 2000. .
 Seale, William, The White House: The History of an American Idea. White House Historical Association: 1992, 2001. .

External links
 Official White House website
 National Park Service website for the President's Park 
 The White House Museum, a detailed online tour of the White House
 The White House Historical Association, with historical photos, online tours and exhibits, timelines, and facts
 Twentieth Century American Sculpture at the White House, including artists Nancy Graves, Allan McCollum, and Tom Otterness
 The American Presidency Project

White House
White House Executive Residence Operations